The 2015–16 Jackson State Tigers basketball team represented Jackson State University during the 2015–16 NCAA Division I men's basketball season. The Tigers, led by third year head coach Wayne Brent, played their home games at the Williams Assembly Center and were members of the Southwestern Athletic Conference. They finished the season 20–16, 12–6 in SWAC play to finish in third place. They defeated Prairie View A&M and Mississippi Valley State to advance to the championship game of the SWAC tournament where they lost to Southern. They were invited to the CollegeInsider.com Tournament where they defeated Sam Houston State in the first round to advance to the second round where they lost to Grand Canyon.

Roster

Schedule

|-
!colspan=9 style="background:#092183; color:#FFFFFF;"| Regular season

|-
!colspan=9 style="background:#092183; color:#FFFFFF;"|SWAC regular season

|-
!colspan=9 style="background:#092183; color:#FFFFFF;"| SWAC tournament

|-
!colspan=9 style="background:#092183; color:#FFFFFF;"| CIT

References

Jackson State Tigers basketball seasons
Jackson State
Jackson State